The Marshall Thundering Herd college football team competes as part of the National Collegiate Athletic Association (NCAA) Division I Football Bowl Subdivision (FBS), representing the Marshall University in the East Division of the Sun Belt Conference (SBC). Since the establishment of the team in 1895, Marshall has appeared in 19 bowl games (officially 18). The latest bowl win occurred on December 19, 2022, when Marshall defeated UConn 28–14 in the 2022 Myrtle Beach Bowl. The victory in that game brought the Herd's overall bowl record to thirteen wins and six losses (13–6).

Key

Bowl games

Notes

References 

Marshall Thundering Herd

Marshall Thundering Herd bowl games